Benjamin Pierre Guité (born July 17, 1978) is a Canadian ice hockey coach and former professional forward. Guité played 13 seasons of professional hockey, most notably in the National Hockey League with the Boston Bruins, Colorado Avalanche, and the Nashville Predators. He is the son of former World Hockey Association player Pierre Guité.

After his playing career, he began coaching. In 2021 he was the head coach of the Maine Mariners in the ECHL.  As of July 2022, he is the head coach of the Bowdoin College Men's hockey team.

Playing career 
As a youth, Guité played in the 1992 Quebec International Pee-Wee Hockey Tournament with a minor ice hockey team from the Lac-Saint-Louis area of Montreal.

Guité was drafted 172nd overall in the 1997 NHL Entry Draft by the Montreal Canadiens. Guité played junior hockey for the Capital District Selects of the Eastern Junior Hockey League, before continuing his career at the University of Maine in the Hockey East division. Unsigned, Guité made his professional debut in 2000 with the Tallahassee Tiger Sharks of the ECHL before signing with the New York Islanders as a free agent on August 1, 2001.

On March 19, 2002, while playing with the Bridgeport Sound Tigers of the American Hockey League (AHL), Guité was traded by the Islanders along with Bjorn Melin to the Mighty Ducks of Anaheim for Dave Roche. A year later Guité returned to Bridgeport signing as a free agent.

On August 15, 2005, Guité was signed by the Boston Bruins and played just a solitary game, his NHL debut, on January 30, 2006. After spending most of his time with the Providence Bruins in the 2005–06 season, Guité signed with the Colorado Avalanche on July 12, 2006.

Guité ended the 2006–07 season establishing a role as a defensive forward on the Avalanche, and re-signed for a further two seasons for the team.

In the 2007–08 season, his first full season in the NHL, Guité played 79 games, totalling 11 goals and 11 assists for 22 points. Guité also had his first 2-goal game in a 6-4 win over the St. Louis Blues on February 3, 2008.

On July 14, 2009 Guité signed a one-year, two-way contract with the Nashville Predators. He made his debut with Nashville on opening night for the 2009–10 season against the Dallas Stars on October 3, 2009. Guité played only four games with the Predators before he was reassigned to add a veteran presence to AHL affiliate, the Milwaukee Admirals, for the majority of the season.

After a single season with the Predators organization, Guité left as a free agent and signed a one-year contract with the Columbus Blue Jackets on August 18, 2010.

On July 7, 2011 Guité was signed by the San Jose Sharks on a one-year, two-way contract. Assigned to AHL affiliate, the Worcester Sharks, Guité's 2011–12 season was limited to 26 games due to concussion.

On October 10, 2012, with the NHL lockout impeding his options to sign a contract in North America, Guité signed on his first European venture to a one-year deal with Italian team HC Pustertal-Val Pusteria Wolves of the Serie A.

Coaching career 
On June 10, 2013, Guité began his first coaching stint as assistant coach for the University of Maine under first year head coach Red Gendron. Guité was promoted to associate head coach on October 14, 2014. 
From April 14 to May 12, 2021, Guité served as interim head coach of the Black Bears following the death of Gendron until the hiring of Ben Barr as head coach. Prior to the 2021–22 season, he was hired by the Maine Mariners of the ECHL as head coach. In July 2022, he was named head coach of the Bowdoin College Men's hockey team.

Career statistics

References

External links 

1978 births
Living people
Albany River Rats players
Boston Bruins players
Bridgeport Sound Tigers players
Canadian ice hockey centres
Cincinnati Mighty Ducks players
Colorado Avalanche players
Ice hockey people from Montreal
Maine Black Bears men's ice hockey players
Milwaukee Admirals players
Montreal Canadiens draft picks
Nashville Predators players
Providence Bruins players
HC Pustertal Wölfe players
Springfield Falcons players
Tallahassee Tiger Sharks players
Worcester Sharks players
Canadian expatriate ice hockey players in Italy
NCAA men's ice hockey national champions
Bowdoin Polar Bears men's ice hockey coaches